The Batty Weber Prize or Prix Batty Weber is Luxembourg's national literary prize. It has been awarded every three years since 1987 to a Luxembourg writer for his entire literary work. It is named after the writer Batty Weber (1860–1940) who considerably influenced Luxembourg's cultural life.

Laureats

 1987: Edmond Dune
 1990: Roger Manderscheid
 1993: Léopold Hoffmann
 1996: Anise Koltz 
 1999: Nic Weber
 2002: Pol Greisch
 2005: Guy Rewenig
 2008: Nico Helminger
 2011: Jean Portante
 2014: Lambert Schlechter
 2017: Georges Hausemer
 2020: Pierre Joris

See also
Literature of Luxembourg

References

Awards established in 1987
Luxembourgian literary awards